Walgett Shire is a local government area in the Orana region of New South Wales, Australia. The northern boundary of the Shire is located adjacent to the border between New South Wales and Queensland. The town of Walgett is located on the Namoi River, nearby to its junction with the Barwon River and at the junction of the Kamilaroi Highway and the Castlereagh Highway. 
 
The Shire is divided between the agricultural areas (producing wool, cattle, wheat and cotton), which are near the Barwon and Namoi rivers or south-east of the Barwon River, and the outback country north-west of the Barwon River, including the black opal mining and fossicking town of Lightning Ridge. Prior to 1957, when Lightning Ridge was established as a significant settlement, the outback country was part of the Western Division.

The Mayor of Walgett Shire Council is Jane Keir who is unaligned with any political party.

Towns and villages

Walgett Shire includes Walgett, Lightning Ridge, Collarenebri, Pilliga, Pokataroo, Rowena, Burren Junction, Cryon, Cumborah, Glengarry and Carinda. Come By Chance was established in 1840, before all of the above towns and villages.

Heritage listings
Walgett Shire has a number of heritage-listed sites, including:
 Collarenebri, Gundabloui Road: Collarenebri Aboriginal Cemetery

Demographics

According to the Australian Bureau of Statistics during 2003-04 there:
 were 1,726 wage and salary earners (ranked 123rd in New South Wales and 393rd in Australia, less than 0.1% of both New South Wales's 2,558,415 and Australia's 7,831,856)
 was a total income of $55 million (ranked 121st in New South Wales and 391st in Australia, less than 0.1% of both New South Wales's $107 billion and Australia's $304 billion)
 was an estimated average income per wage and salary earner of $31,980 (ranked 112th in New South Wales and 376th in Australia, 77% of New South Wales's $41,407 and 82% of Australia's $38,820)
 was an estimated median income per wage and salary earner of $29,155 (ranked 119th in New South Wales and 406th in Australia, 82% of New South Wales's $35,479 and 85% of Australia's $34,149).

Council

Between 2004 and 2008, the Council was controlled by an Administrator, Vic Smith, appointed by the New South Wales Minister for Local Government. The previous Walgett Shire Council was split between factions representing Lightning Ridge and the rest of the Shire and apparently became unworkable as a result. Other matters investigated included poor administration, failure to properly inform Councillors in relation to some matters, apparently illegal walkouts by some Councilors to frustrate votes and, in particular, events surrounding a failed project to build a community centre in Lightning Ridge.

Current composition and election method
Walgett Shire Council is composed of nine Councillors elected proportionally as a single ward. All Councillors are elected for a fixed four-year term of office. The Mayor is elected by the Councillors at the first meeting of the Council. The most recent election was held on 10 September 2016, and the makeup of the Council is as follows:

The current Council, elected in 2016, in order of election, is:

References

External links

 Walgett Shire Council official website

 
Local government areas of New South Wales
1906 establishments in Australia
Populated places established in 1906